Sobekneferu or Neferusobek ( meaning 'Beauty of Sobek') was a pharaoh of ancient Egypt and the last ruler of the Twelfth Dynasty of the Middle Kingdom. She ascended to the throne following the death of Amenemhat IV, possibly her brother or husband, though their relationship is unproven. Instead, she asserted legitimacy through her father Amenemhat III. Her reign lasted 3 years, 10 months, and 24 days, according to the Turin King List.

She adopted the full royal titulary, distinguishing herself from prior female rulers. She was also the first ruler to have a name associated with the crocodile god Sobek. Contemporary evidence for her reign is scant: there are a few partial statues – one with her face – and inscriptions that have been uncovered. It is assumed that the Northern Mazghuna pyramid was intended for her, though this assignment is speculative with no firm evidence to confirm it. The monument was abandoned with only the substructure ever completed. A papyrus discovered in Harageh mentions a place called Sekhem Sobekneferu that may refer to the pyramid. Her rule is attested on several king lists.

Family 

Sobekneferu was the daughter of Pharaoh Amenemhat III, but her mother's identity is unknown. Amenemhat III had two known wives, Aat and an unknown queen, both buried in his pyramid at Dahshur. He had at least one other daughter, Neferuptah, who had a burial at his second pyramid at Hawara that was eventually moved to her own pyramid. Neferuptah appears to have been groomed as Amenemhat III's heir as she had her name enclosed in a cartouche. Evidence of burials of three other princesses – Hathorhotep, Nubhotepet, and Sithathor – were found at the Dahshur complex, but it is not clear whether these princesses were his daughters as the complex was used for royal burials throughout the Thirteenth Dynasty.

Amenemhat III's eventual heir, Amenemhat IV, is attested to be the son of Hetepti, though her titulary lacks reference to her being a 'King's Wife'. The relationship between Amenemhat IV and Sobekneferu remains unclear. According to the ancient historian Manetho in Aegyptiaca they were brother and sister. According to Gae Callender they were also probably married. Although, neither the title of 'King's Wife' nor 'King's Sister' are attested for Sobekneferu. Sobekneferu's accession may have been motivated by the lack of a male heir for Amenemhat IV. However, two kings of the Thirteenth Dynasty, Sobekhotep I and Sonbef, have been identified as possible sons of his based on their shared nomen 'Amenemhat'. As such, Sobekneferu may have usurped the throne after Amenemhat IV's death, viewing his heirs as illegitimate.

Female Kingship 
Sobekneferu was one of the few women that ruled in Egypt, and the first to adopt the full royal titulary, distinguishing herself from any prior female rulers. She was also the first ruler associated with the crocodile god Sobek by name, whose identity appears in both her birth and throne names. Kara Cooney views ancient Egypt as unique in allowing women to acquire formal – and absolute – power. She posits that women were elevated to the throne during crises to guide the civilization and maintain social order. Though, she also notes that, this elevation to power was illusory. Women acquired the throne as temporary replacements for a male leader; their reigns were regularly targeted for erasure by their successors; and overall, Egyptian society was oppressive to women. 

In ancient Egyptian historiography, there is some evidence for other female rulers. As early as the First Dynasty, Meritneith is proposed to have ruled as regent for her son. In the Fifth Dynasty, Setibhor may have been a female king regnant based on the manner her monuments were targets for destruction. Another candidate, Nitocris, is generally considered to have ruled in the Sixth Dynasty, though there is little proof of her historicity and she is not mentioned before the Eighteenth Dynasty. The kingship of Nitocris may instead be a Greek legend and that the name originated with an incorrect translation of Neitiqerty Siptah.

Reign 
The Middle Kingdom was in decline by the time of Sobekneferu's accession. The peak of the Middle Kingdom is attributed to Senusret III and Amenemhat III. Senusret III formed the basis for the legendary character Sesostris described by Manetho and Herodotus. He reigned for 39 years, as evidenced by an inscription in Abydos, where he was buried. Amenemhat III, in contrast, presided over a peaceful Egypt that consisted of monumental constructions, the development of Faiyum, and numerous mining expeditions. His reign lasted at least 45 years, probably longer. He built two pyramids, at Dahshur and at Hawara. Nicolas Grimal notes that such long reigns contributed to the end of the Twelfth Dynasty, but without the collapse that ended the Old Kingdom. Amenemhat IV ruled for 9 or 10 years. There is little information regarding his reign.

It is to this backdrop that Sobekneferu acquired the throne. She reigned for around 4 years, but as with her predecessor, there are few surviving records. Her death brought a close to the Twelfth Dynasty and began the Second Intermediate Period spanning the following two centuries. 

This period is poorly understood owing to the paucity of references to the rulers of the time. She was succeeded by either Sobekhotep I or Wegaf, who inaugurated the Thirteenth Dynasty. Stephen Quirke proposed, based on the numerosity of kingships and brevity of their rule, that a rotating succession of kings from Egypt's most powerful families took the throne. They retained Itj-tawy as their capital through the Thirteenth Dynasty. Their role, however, was relegated to a much lesser status than earlier and power rested within the administration. It is generally accepted that Egypt remained unified until late into the dynasty. Kim Ryholt contends that the Fourteenth Dynasty instead arose in the Nile Delta at the end of Sobekneferu's reign as a rival to the Thirteenth. Thomas Schneider argues that the evidence for this hypothesis is weak.

Attestations

Contemporary evidence 

Only a small collection of sources attest to Sobekneferu's rule as pharaoh of Egypt. A graffito in Kumma, a Nubian fortress, records the height of the Nile inundation at  during her third regnal year. Another inscription discovered in the Eastern Desert records "year 4, second month of the Season of the Emergence". The British Museum has a fine cylinder seal bearing her name and royal titulary in its collection.

A handful of headless statues of Sobekneferu have been identified. In one quartzite image, she blends feminine and masculine dress with an inscription reading 'daughter of Re(?), of his body, Sobekneferu, may she live like Re forever'. On her torso rests a pendant modelled on that worn by Senusret III. Three basalt statues of the female king were found in Tell ed-Dab'a; two depict her in a seated posture, another shows her kneeling. In one, she is depicted trampling the Nine Bows, representing the subjugation of Egypt's enemies. The three statues appear to be life-sized.  One statue with her head is known. The bust was held in the Egyptian Museum of Berlin but was lost during World War II. Its existence is confirmed by photographic images and plaster casts. It fits on top of the lower part of a seated statuette discovered at Semna which bears the royal symbol smꜣ tꜣwy on the side of the throne. The lower half is held at the Museum of Fine Arts, Boston. There is a statuette in the Metropolitan Museum of Art in New York that has been suggested to represent Sobekneferu, though this assignment is unverified. The schist bust depicts a woman in a wig, wearing a crown composed of a uraeus cobra and two vultures with outstretched wings which is of unknown iconography, and the ḥb-sd cloak. The base of another statue bearing her name and identified as the representation of a king's royal daughter was discovered in Gezer, though it may also refer to a daughter of Senusret I or another unknown Sobekneferu. A headless black basalt sphinx discovered by Édouard Naville in Khatana-Qantir bearing a damaged inscription is also tentatively assigned to Sobekneferu.

There is evidence that she had structures built in Heracleopolis Magna and added to the Pyramid of Amenemhat III in Hawara. She left inscriptions on four granite papyriform columns found at a temple in Kom el-Akârib, while a further ten granite beams there may date to the same period. Her monumental works consistently associate her with Amenemhat III rather than Amenemhat IV, supporting the theory that she was the royal daughter of Amenemhat III and perhaps only a stepsister to Amenemhat IV, whose mother was not royal. Contemporary sources from her reign show that Sobekneferu adopted only the 'King's Daughter' title, which further supports this hypothesis. An example of such an inscription comes from a limestone block of 'the Labyrinth' of the Pyramid at Hawara. It reads 'Beloved of Dḥdḥt the good god Nỉ-mꜣꜥt-rꜥ [Amenemhat III] given [...] * Daughter of Re, Sobekneferu lord of Shedet, given all life'. The inscription is also the only known reference to a goddess Dḥdḥt. By contrast, Amenemhat IV's name does not appear at Hawara.

Historical sources 

She is mentioned on the Karnak list of early Egyptian kings, the Saqqara Tablet, and Turin King List, but is conspicuously excluded from the Abydos king list. Her exclusion, along with all other female kings, pharaohs of the First and Second Intermediate Periods, and of the Amarna Period, is an indicator of whom Ramesses II and Seti I viewed as the legitimate rulers of Egypt. She is credited in the Turin Canon with a reign of 3 years, 10 months, and 24 days. She is  mentioned by Manetho as 'Scemiophris', where she is credited with a reign of 4 years.

Funerary monument 
Sobekneferu's tomb has not yet been positively identified. The Northern Mazghuna pyramid is assumed to be her monument. There is, however, no clear evidence to confirm this assignment and the pyramid may date to a period well after the end of the Twelfth Dynasty. Only its substructure was completed; construction of the superstructure and wider temple complex was never begun. The passages of the substructure had a complex plan. A stairway descended south from the east side of the pyramid leading to a square chamber which connected to the next sloping passage leading west to a portcullis. The portcullis consisted of a  quartzite block intended to slide into and block the passage. Beyond the passage wound through several more turns and a second smaller portcullis before terminating at the antechamber. South of this lay the burial chamber which was almost entirely occupied by a quartzite monolith which acted as the vessel for a sarcophagus. In a deep recess lay a quartzite lid which was to be slid into place over the coffin and then locked into place by a stone slab blocking it. The builders had all exposed surfaces painted red and added lines of black paint. A causeway leading to the pyramid was built of mudbrick, which must have been used by the workers. Though the burial place had been constructed, no burial was interred at the site. A place called Sekhem Sobekneferu is mentioned on a papyrus found at Harageh which may be the name of her pyramid. On a funerary stela from Abydos, now in Marseille, there is mention of a storeroom administrator of Sobekneferu named Heby. The stela dates to the 13th Dynasty and attests to an ongoing funerary cult.

See also 
 Hatshepsut
 Merneith
 Neithhotep
 Statue of Sobekneferu

Notes

References

Bibliography

General sources

Royal titulary 

 
 
 
 
 
 

19th-century BC Pharaohs
19th-century BC Egyptian women
19th-century BC women rulers
Pharaohs of the Twelfth Dynasty of Egypt
Female pharaohs
19th-century BC deaths
19th-century BC births
Children of Amenemhat III